Elvira Kralj (born 16 August 1900 in Trieste; died 6  September 1978) was a Slovenian actress who has been featured on a stamp. She also became a Prešeren laureate in 1969.

References 

1900 births
1978 deaths
Prešeren Award laureates
Actors from Trieste
Slovenian film actresses
20th-century Slovenian actresses